Daniela de Jesús Cosío (born January 11, 1986) is a Mexican model. She began modeling after participating in the national beauty pageant Nuestra Belleza Mexico 2005, where she placed as the runner-up.

Early life 
She was born on January 11, 1986, in La Paz, Baja California Sur, Mexico. She has a brother Noel Abraham.

Career 
She was contracted by Major Model Management in New York City and Milan.  She subsequently appeared in international editions of Vogue and Maxim. As a runway model, she walked for designers such as Marchesa, Guess?, Baby Phat, Chado Ralph Rucci, Mara Hoffman, Jean Paul Gaultier, Georges Hobeika, Iceberg, Marithé François Girbaud, Vivienne Westwood, Betsey Johnson, and Pamella Roland.  In 2010, Cosio was featured in Pantene Shine Satisfaction commercial. Daniela was in the ad campaigns for Express' Spring/Summer 2012 collection Express Loyalty Fragrance Men's Fragrance S/S 2012, Love Express Fragrance Fragrance Campaign S/S 2012  Models.com ranked Cosio at number 25 on its "Money Girls" list.

Advertisements

Abercrombie & Fitch, Antica Murrina, Aubade, Ava Strahl, Chilly, Clarins, Demetrios International, Eckō Unltd., Timepieces, Express, Express 'Love Express' fragrance, Express 'Loyalty' fragrance, Fiorucci, Goldenpoint, Guess?, Henry Cotton's, L'Oreal, La Senza, Lorimar, Marsel, Newport Polarized, Pantene, Penti, Philippe Matignon, Ralph Lauren 'Big Pony' fragrances, Victoria's Secret, Vinni ad Yamamay.

Magazine Covers
Vogue Gioiello - 2007; Maxim - April 2008; Grazia - January 2009 
Mexico: Balance - 2006 Spain: Beauty Forum - May 2010 US: Simply the Best - January/February 2007; Palm Beach Illustrated - April 2007

References

External links 

  Daniela Cosio, la paceña que desfilará para Etam in bcs noticias on February 26, 2014 
  Daniela Cosío, una de las musas de Giorgio Armani in bcs noticias on September 1, 2014
  Daniela Cosío, primera sudcaliforniana en posar para Cosmopolitan in Octavo Día on November 8, 2014
  La bella sudcaliforniana Daniela Cosío ligó portada en Cosmpolitan México in El Sol de Puebla on November 8, 2014
  Daniela Cosío protagoniza campaña de Police con el futbolista Neymar in bcs noticias on December 6, 2014
  10 Modelos latinas más famosas en la industria de la moda by Begoña De Ubieta, in viveUSA on April 9, 2015

1986 births
Living people
Mexican beauty pageant winners
Mexican female models
People from La Paz, Baja California Sur
21st-century Mexican women